The 1906 United Kingdom general election was held from 12 January to 8 February 1906.

The Liberals, led by Prime Minister Henry Campbell-Bannerman, won a landslide majority at the election. The Conservatives led by Arthur Balfour, who had been in government until the month before the election, lost more than half their seats, including party leader Balfour's own seat in Manchester East, leaving the party with its fewest recorded seats ever in history. The election saw a 5.4% swing from the Conservative Party to the Liberal Party, the largest-ever seen at the time (however, if only looking at seats contested in both 1900 and 1906, the Conservative vote fell by 11.6%). This has resulted in the 1906 general election being dubbed the "Liberal landslide", and is now ranked alongside the 1931, 1945, 1983, 1997 and 2001 general elections as one of the largest landslide election victories.

The Labour Representation Committee was far more successful than at the 1900 general election and after the election would be renamed the Labour Party with 29 MPs and Keir Hardie as leader. The Irish Parliamentary Party, led by John Redmond, achieved its seats with a relatively low number of votes, as 73 candidates stood unopposed.

This election was a landslide defeat for the Conservative Party and their Liberal Unionist allies, with the primary reason given by historians as the party's weakness after its split over the issue of free trade (Joseph Chamberlain had resigned from government in September 1903 in order to campaign for Tariff Reform, which would allow "preferential tariffs"). Many working-class people at the time saw this as a threat to the price of food, hence the debate was nicknamed "Big Loaf, Little Loaf". The Liberals' landslide victory of 125 seats over all other parties led to the passing of social legislation known as the Liberal reforms.

This was the last general election in which the Liberals won an absolute majority in the House of Commons, and the last general election in which neither Labour nor the Conservatives won the popular vote. It was also the last peacetime election held more than five years after the previous one prior to passage of the Parliament Act 1911, which limited the duration of Parliaments in peacetime to five years. The Conservative Party's seat total of 156 MPs remains its worst result ever in a general election.

Overview 

A coalition between the Conservative and Liberal Unionist parties had governed the United Kingdom since the 1895 general election. Arthur Balfour had served as Prime Minister from 1902 until 5 December 1905, when he chose to resign over growing unpopularity. Instead of calling a general election, Balfour had hoped that under a Liberal government, splits would re-emerge; which would therefore help the Conservative Party achieve victory at the next general election.

The incoming Liberal government chose to capitalise on the Conservative government's unpopularity and called an immediate general election one month later on 12 January 1906, which resulted in a crushing defeat for the Conservatives.

Conservative unpopularity 

The Unionist government had become deeply divided over the issue of free trade, which soon became an electoral liability. This culminated in Joseph Chamberlain's resignation from the government in May 1903 to campaign for tariff reform in order to protect British industry from foreign competition. This division was in contrast to the Liberal Party's belief in free trade, which it argued would help keep costs of living down.

The issue of free trade became the feature of the Liberal campaign, under the slogan 'big loaf' under a Liberal government, 'little loaf' under a Conservative government. It also commissioned a variety of posters warning the electorate over rises in food prices under protectionist policies, including one which mentioned that "Balfour and Chamberlain are linked together against free trade ... Don't be deceived by Tory tricks".

The Boer War had also contributed to the unpopularity of the Conservative and Unionist government. The war had lasted over two and half years, much longer than had originally been expected, while details were revealed of the existence of concentration camps where over 20,000 men, women and children were reported to have died because of poor sanitation.

The war had also unearthed the poor social state of the country in the early-1900s. This was after more than 40% of military recruits for the Boer War were declared unfit for military service; in Manchester, 8,000 of the 11,000 men who had been recruited had to be turned away for being in poor physical condition. This was after the 1902 Rowntree study of poverty in York showed that almost one-third of the population lived below the 'poverty line', which helped to increase the calls for social reforms, something which had been neglected by the Conservative and Unionist government.

The Conservative and Unionist Prime Minister, Arthur Balfour, had been blamed over the issue of 'Chinese Slavery', which was the use of Chinese-indentured labour in South Africa. This became controversial among the Conservative Party's middle-class supporters, who saw it as unethical, while the working-class also objected to the practice, as White emigration to South Africa could have created jobs for the unemployed in Britain.

Protestant Nonconformists were angered when Conservatives pushed through the Education Act 1902, which integrated denominational schools into the state system and provided for their support from taxes. The local school boards that they largely controlled were abolished and replaced by county governments that were usually controlled by Anglicans. Worst of all, the traditionally better-endowed and socially superior Anglican schools would thus receive funding from local taxes that everyone had to pay. One tactic was to refuse to pay local taxes. The school system played a major role in the Liberal victory in 1906, as Dissenter (nonconformist) Conservatives punished their old party and voted Liberal. However, the Liberals were conscious of the call to fair treatment their victory had in the counties and neither repealed or modified the 1902 law. Another issue which lost the Conservatives nonconformist votes was the Licensing Act 1904. Although the legislation aimed to reduce the number of public houses, it proposed to compensate brewers for the cancellation of their licence, leading many who adhered to temperance to denounce it as a "brewers' bill".

Results 

|}

Voting summary

Seats summary

Analysis 
According to historian Lawrence Goldman:

Notable results 

The landslide Liberal victory led to many Conservative and Unionist MPs losing what had previously been regarded as safe seats. This resulted in prominent Conservative ministers being unseated including former Prime Minister Arthur Balfour. Only three of the Conservative cabinet which had served until December 1905 (one month before the election) held onto their seats, the outgoing: Home Secretary Aretas Akers-Douglas, Chancellor Austen Chamberlain (Liberal Unionist), Secretary of State for War H.O. Arnold-Forster who changed to that allied party before the election.

Manchester East 
Arthur Balfour, who entered the general election as the Conservative Party leader and had until the month before been Prime Minister, unexpectedly lost his seat in the Manchester East constituency, a seat which he had represented since 1885. The result in Manchester East saw a large 22.4% swing to the Liberal candidate Thomas Gardner Horridge, much larger than the national 5.4% swing to the Liberals.

The Liberal candidate in Manchester East had been helped by a pact with the local Labour Party. Horridge said of his victory that "East Manchester is essentially a Labour constituency and the great Labour party has supported my candidacy very thoroughly and very loyally". He also said that "[Manchester East constituents] have returned me, I take it, first to uphold free trade, next to deal with Chinese labour, and after that to support legislation on the lines laid down in the programme of the Labour party, with which I am heartily in accord".

Balfour's unseating became symbolic of the Conservative Party's landslide defeat. The result has since been called one of the biggest upsets in British political history and remains the only instance of a former Prime Minister and Leader of the Opposition losing their seat in a General election.

Gladstone–MacDonald pact 

Prior to the 1906 general election, the Labour and Liberal parties negotiated an informal agreement to ensure the anti-Conservative vote was not split between the two parties. The Gladstone–MacDonald pact agreed in 1903 meant that, in 31 of the 50 seats where Labour Party candidates stood, the Liberal Party did not put up a candidate. This proved helpful to both parties, as 24 of Labour's 29 elected MPs came from constituencies where the Liberal Party agreed not to contest, while the pact allowed the Liberals to concentrate resources on Conservative/Liberal marginal constituencies.

See also 
List of MPs elected in the 1906 United Kingdom general election
Parliamentary franchise in the United Kingdom 1885–1918
 Education Act 1902
 1906 United Kingdom general election in Ireland

References

Further reading 
 
 Betts, Oliver. (2016)"'The People’s Bread': A Social History of Joseph Chamberlain and the Tariff Reform Campaign." in Joseph Chamberlain: International Statesman, National Leader, Local Icon ed by I. Cawood and C. Upton. (Palgrave Macmillan, London, 2016) pp. 130–150.
 
 
 
 
 
 Halévy, Élie (1956), The Rule of Democracy (1905–1914), pp. 64–90. online
 
 Machin, G. I. T. (1982) "The Last Victorian Anti-Ritualist Campaign, 1895-1906." Victorian Studies 25.3 (1982): 277–302.  online
 Purdue, A. W. (1973) "George Lansbury and the Middlesbrough election of 1906." International Review of Social History 18.3 (1973): 333–352.
 
 
 Watson, Robert Spence. (1907) The National Liberal Federation: From Its Commencement to the General Election of 1906. (T. Fisher Unwin, 1907) online.

External links 
Spartacus: Political Parties and Election Results
United Kingdom election results—summary results 1885–1979

Manifestos 
1906 Conservative manifesto
1906 Labour manifesto
1906 Liberal manifesto

 
 General election
1906
January 1906 events
February 1906 events
1906 elections in Ireland
Henry Campbell-Bannerman